The Argentina Open or Abierto Argentino established in 1927 as the Argentina International Championships is an annual tennis event for male tennis players held in Buenos Aires, Argentina. The tournament is an ATP Tour 250 event on the ATP Tour, and is played on outdoor clay courts at the 5,500 capacity Buenos Aires Lawn Tennis Club, in the Palermo barrio (neighbourhood). Usually held in February, it includes both a men's singles and a men's doubles tournament. Between 1970 and 1989 it was part of the Grand Prix tennis circuit and a Grand Prix Super Series event (1970–71).

History
The tournament is currently without sponsor, but presented by the City of Buenos Aires. Previously the event was known by different names such as Argentina International Championships (1921-1968), South American Open (1969-1974), ATP Buenos Aries (1978-80, 1993-95), Copa AT&T and Copa Telmex.

Previous finals

Singles

Doubles

Media coverage

Television 

In Argentina, Latin America and the United States the ATP from Buenos Aires is broadcast Live and Exclusive on TyC Sports in Pay TV (Cable and Satellite).

References

External links
 Official website
 Association of Tennis Professionals (ATP) tournament profile

 
Tennis tournaments in Argentina
Clay court tennis tournaments
Grand Prix tennis circuit